Cielętniki may refer to the following places in Poland:
Cielętniki, Lower Silesian Voivodeship (south-west Poland)
Cielętniki, Silesian Voivodeship (south Poland)